Gaspare Spatuzza (Palermo, 8 April 1964) is a Sicilian mafioso from the Brancaccio quarter in Palermo. He was an assassin for the brothers Filippo and Giuseppe Graviano who headed the Mafia family of Brancaccio. After the arrest of the Gravianos in January 1994, he apparently succeeded them as the regent of the Mafia family. He was arrested in 1997 and started to cooperate with the judicial authorities in 2008. In his testimony he claimed that media tycoon and prime minister Silvio Berlusconi made a deal with the Sicilian Mafia in 1993 that put the country "in the hands" of Cosa Nostra.

Mafia killer
Spatuzza had been convicted of six bomb attacks and 40 homicides. He confessed the murder of the parish priest, father Pino Puglisi, on 15 September 1993. Puglisi was the pastor of San Gaetano's Parish in the rough Palermo neighbourhood of Brancaccio, and spoke out against the Mafia.

Spatuzza himself was arrested in July 1997. On 14 April 1998, Spatuzza, Nino Mangano, Cosimo Lo Nigro and Luigi Giacalone received life sentences for the killing of father Puglisi. He was also convicted for the murder of the young son of state witness Santino Di Matteo, Giuseppe, who had been kidnapped and killed after 779 days in a failed attempt to force the father to retract his testimony on the killing of Antimafia judge Giovanni Falcone. At the trial, Spatuzza had also asked Giuseppe Di Matteo's family for forgiveness. In 2012, Spatuzza himself was sentenced to 12 years in prison for his role in the murder.

In June 1998, he also received a life sentence for a series of bomb attacks in 1993 in via dei Georgofili in Florence, the Via Palestro massacre in Milan and in the churches of St. John Lateran and San Giorgio in Velabro in Rome, which left 10 people dead and 93 injured as well as damage to centres of cultural heritage such as the Uffizi Gallery.

The bomb attacks were part of a campaign of terror in 1993 against the state to get them to back off in their crackdown against the Mafia after the murders of Antimafia magistrates Giovanni Falcone and Paolo Borsellino in 1992.

Pentito
In October 2008, it became known that he had turned into a witness for the prosecution (pentito) four months earlier after spending 11 years in jail on a strict prison regime. He said he had become religious in prison and, facing "a choice between God and the Cosa Nostra", chose to cooperate and tell the truth. He enrolled in theology courses in 2009.

He admitted he had stolen the Fiat 126 used for the car bomb that killed Borsellino in the Via D'Amelio bombing in Palermo on 19 July 1992. His admission contradicted the declarations of a thug with loose Mafia associations who had confessed to stealing the car. When confronted with Spatuzza's statement, the thug admitted that he had repeated what some investigating officers had forced him to tell the magistrates. Spatuzza's detailed testimony stood up against examination. Spatuzza's declaration led to the re-opening of the trial on Borsellino's murder, which was concluded in 2003.

Dealing with Berlusconi
Spatuzza's boss Giuseppe Graviano told him in 1994 that future prime minister Silvio Berlusconi was bargaining with the Mafia, concerning a political-electoral agreement between Cosa Nostra and Berlusconi's party Forza Italia, in exchange for certain guarantees – such as to stop the bomb terror campaign. Berlusconi entered politics a few months later and won his first term as Prime Minister in 1994. Spatuzza said Graviano disclosed the information to him during a conversation in a bar Graviano owned in the upscale Via Veneto district of the Italian capital Rome. Berlusconi's right-hand man Marcello Dell'Utri was the intermediary, according to Spatuzza. Dell'Utri has dismissed Spatuzza's allegations as "nonsense".

His assertions back up previous statements of the pentito Antonino Giuffrè, who said that the Graviano brothers were the intermediaries between Cosa Nostra and Berlusconi. Cosa Nostra decided to back Berlusconi's Forza Italia party from its foundation in 1993, in exchange for help in resolving the Mafia's judicial problems. The Mafia turned to Forza Italia when its traditional contacts in the discredited Christian Democrat party proved unable to protect its members from the rigours of the law. "The statements given by Spatuzza about prime minister Berlusconi are baseless and can be in no way verified," according to Berlusconi's lawyer and MP for the People of Freedom party (Il Popolo della Libertà, PdL), Niccolò Ghedini.

On December 4, 2009, Spatuzza repeated his accusations in court at the appeal hearing against Dell’Utri, sentenced to 9 years in 2004, for collusion with the Mafia.  Testifying from behind a screen in the courtroom, surrounded by several bodyguards, he declared: "Graviano told me the name of Berlusconi and said that thanks to him and the man from our home town [an apparent reference to Dell' Utri] we have the country in our hands." Dell'Utri told the court that neither he nor Berlusconi had Mafia connections. "It's in the interest of the Mafia to force the collapse of the Berlusconi government because this government has done the most in the fight against organised crime." Berlusconi has denounced the claims of Spatuzza as "vile", and "unfounded and defamatory".

On 11 December 2009, Filippo Graviano denied the assertions of Spatuzza before the court of Palermo. He said that he had never met Dell'Utri directly or indirectly.

References 

1964 births
Living people
Gangsters from Palermo
Pentiti
Sicilian mafiosi sentenced to life imprisonment
People convicted of murder by Italy
Sicilian mafiosi